Diana Margarida Coelho Durães (born 8 June 1996) is a Portuguese swimmer who holds national records in the 200, 400, 800, 1500 and 5000 metres freestyle. She competed in the women's 200 metre freestyle event at the 2017 World Aquatics Championships. At club level, she represents S.L. Benfica.

References

External links
 

1996 births
Living people
People from Fafe
Swimmers at the 2018 Mediterranean Games
Mediterranean Games bronze medalists for Portugal
S.L. Benfica (swimming)
Mediterranean Games medalists in swimming
Portuguese female freestyle swimmers
Swimmers at the 2020 Summer Olympics
Olympic swimmers of Portugal
Sportspeople from Braga District